Jens Voigt (born 17 September 1971) is a German former professional road bicycle racer and, upon retirement, became a cycling sports broadcast commentator.  During his cycling career, Voigt raced for several teams, the last one being UCI ProTeam . Voigt wore the yellow jersey of the Tour de France twice, though he was never a contender for the overall title owing to the mountainous nature of the stages of the race being better suited to climbing specialists. His career achievements include winning the Critérium International a record-tying 5 times and a number of one-week stage races, as well as two Tour de France stage victories. In September 2014, he set a new hour record.

Among cycling fans, Voigt was generally popular, both for his aggressive riding style and his affable, forthright and articulate manners in dealing with the public and media. He speaks fluent French and English, in addition to his native German.

Early life
Voigt was born in Grevesmühlen, now in the state of Mecklenburg-Vorpommern, then in East Germany, about 100 km north-east of Hamburg, in the same area as Tour de France winner Jan Ullrich. Voigt was encouraged by his parents to participate in sports, since he often got into trouble as a youngster thanks to his excessive energy. His early performance indicated he had good endurance potential, and he joined a national sports school at age 14 and trained in cycling and track and field.

Career

Debut
Voigt won the Peace Race in 1994 and topped the UCI "Challenge Mondial Amateurs" rankings in December 1994. After a four-year stint in the German Army, much of it spent with a special sports unit, he started professional cycling in 1997, winning races for the Australian team ZVVZ-Giant-Australian Institute of Sport.

In 1998, with the support of his former Australian Institute of Sport Sports Director, German-born Heiko Salzwedel, he moved to the big French team  (which became ) where he spent the five years amassing 20 wins, among them a day in the maillot jaune in the 2001 Tour de France and a stage in that same Tour. Voigt played a part in Jan Ullrich's 2000 Olympic Games win for the German team.

2004–2010
Being tempo specialists, they formed a strong pair as they dominated the 2004 and 2005 LuK Challenge race, a two-man time trial.

Voigt rode the 2004 Tour de France for Team CSC captain Ivan Basso. Voigt and teammate Jakob Piil were often in breakaways, covering the break for CSC. On the 15th stage, Voigt was in a break as Ullrich attacked up the Col de l'Echarasson, leaving race leader Lance Armstrong and second-placed Basso. With Armstrong's team unable to pull Ullrich back in, Voigt was ordered back from his breakaway to help Basso defend his place. Voigt saw Ullrich ride past as he waited for his captain, before he single-handedly closed the gap to Ullrich. Next day was a time trial up the Alpe d'Huez with 900,000 spectators at the roadside. Voigt was heckled by German fans calling him Judas for his effort to ruin fellow German Ullrich's chances. Voigt criticised German TV-channel ARD for starting a witch-hunt against him and pleaded that he was paid by Team CSC, not Germany and that (as he stated in the documentary Overcoming) thanks to his help, Ullrich won his olympic gold medal in 2000.

At the start of 2005, Voigt won the Tour Méditerranéen, ahead of teammates Fränk Schleck 2nd and Nicki Sørensen 4th. Voigt won the first UCI ProTour event, the prologue time trial of the 2005 Paris–Nice, a race Bobby Julich won overall. Voigt nearly won the 2005 classic Liège–Bastogne–Liège when he was beaten on the line by Alexander Vinokourov, Voigt having been on a breakaway almost the entire race.

After a strong placing in the stage 1 time trial of the 2005 Tour de France, Voigt was only trailing race leader Armstrong by 1 minute and he tried hard to take the overall lead. He took part in many attacks, before the first rest day on the 9th stage, he finally got in a break-away that lasted to the line. He finished third, 3 minutes ahead of Armstrong. Voigt's time in the maillot jaune would be short-lived however, as he fell to 168th at stage 10 after a fever, and he was eliminated for failing to finish stage 11 within the time limit. Voigt ended 2005 as 29th on the UCI ProTour individual rankings.

The 2006 season started at a slower pace for Voigt compared to 2005 in order to save energy and be in a position to help Basso in his quest to win the 2006 Giro d'Italia and 2006 Tour de France races. His only result until the Giro in May was an attack on the fifth stage of the Tour of the Basque Country, but he had to settle for second behind stage winner Thomas Voeckler.

For the Giro d'Italia, Voigt rode in support of Basso. Following Team CSC's team time trial win on stage 5, Voigt found himself second, trailing race leader Serhiy Honchar by six seconds. During the first mountains, Voigt helped Basso take the overall lead, while he slid down the board and finished 37th. On mountainous stage 19, Voigt and Julich were in a 20-man break, but as Team CSC was leading the peloton to defend Basso's first place, Voigt and Julich did not work. Up the last climb, Voigt was alone with Spanish rider Juan Manuel Gárate, but as Voigt did not think he had done enough to deserve the victory, he let Garate take the win. Voigt finally got his first win of the season in the Ster Elektrotoer race in June. There he won stage 4 and helped teammate Kurt Asle Arvesen to the overall win, two weeks before the Tour de France.

In the days before the Tour, Basso was suspended by Team CSC after his name had been brought up in the Operación Puerto doping investigation. Carlos Sastre became team captain. Voigt took the role of early attacker, to lessen the load for the team, and he formed or joined unsuccessful breakaways on several stages. On the memorable stage 13 from Béziers to Montélimar, the longest stage of the 2006 Tour at 231 km, Voigt got in a five-man breakaway which finished 29 minutes and 58 seconds ahead of the main bunch. At the line, Voigt outsprinted Óscar Pereiro to take his second Tour stage win. On stage 15, Voigt helped Fränk Schleck from Luxembourg, pulling hard in the break with teammate David Zabriskie of the US, which eventually gave Schleck the win. Voigt finished the 2006 Tour 53rd, helping Sastre finish 4th.

In February 2007, Voigt won the third stage of the Tour of California, which had numerous climbs. After the bunch caught 17 escapees, Levi Leipheimer of  attacked, and only Chris Horner and Voigt could keep up with him. Voigt ultimately prevailed in the sprint over the two men and approached to only 3 seconds behind Leipheimer for the General Classification thanks to time bonuses. He managed to hold on to his second place over the next 4 stages, finishing 21 seconds behind the winner of the Tour, Leipheimer. In April, he met another success at the Critérium International, winning the overall classification and stage 2, a short, undulating stage of 98.5 kilometers finishing in Monthermé. Voigt attacked near the Côte du Mont Malgré Tout, with almost 25 kilometers to go, and crossed the finish line solo, 48 seconds in front of the chasers. The last stage of the race was a short individual time trial of 8.3 kilometers which was raced in the afternoon of the same day, and Voigt stated he gave everything he had but was very careful while negotiating the turns. He finished seventh, keeping his leader's jersey and winning the 3-stage race, while the Swede Thomas Lövkvist of  took second place. Another major win of the 2007 season came for him in the Deutschland Tour, which he won for the second year in a row, with Levi Leipheimer taking second place at 1'57" and David Lopez of  completing the overall classification podium. Voigt stated that his victory was harder to accomplish than the preceding year, when it was somewhat of a surprise. He was a marked man.

Voigt began his 2008 season by taking part in the Paris–Nice and the Tour of California, where he did not obtain high personal results. In March, Voigt grabbed his fourth success on the short stage race Critérium International, registering a victory on stage 2 in the process. Another success awaited him at the stage 18 of the Giro d'Italia. He was part of a group that broke away from the field a mere  into the stage. With  to cover and a six minutes lead, Voigt left the breakaway and soloed to victory in Varese. In June, he came in fifth position of his National Road Race Championship and sixth in his National Time Trial. He was a big part of his team successes in the Tour de France, protecting the leader Carlos Sastre, who won the eighteenth stage atop the Alpe d'Huez climb. Before that decisive stage, the team was counting on a triple threat as far as leaders for the general classification went, with the Schleck brothers, who took fourth and sixth on that mountain stage. Sastre would go on to win the Tour, and the CSC team won the overall team classification. Voigt was selected to represent Germany in the Beijing Olympic Games along with Fabian Wegmann, Gerald Ciolek, Bert Grabsch and Stefan Schumacher. He took part in the road race, which he did not finish. He then dominated the Tour of Poland, earning an individual stage and helping his squad win the Team Time Trial in the process. Citing a long and draining season, Voigt declined to participate in the World Championships, a decision that his team approved.

Voigt began the 2009 season well by winning the Critérium International for the fifth time in his career, tying Frenchman Raymond Poulidor's record while grabbing a stage win, the points classification and the mountains classification. He abandoned the 2009 Tour on 21 July 2009 as a consequence of a violent crash suffered while descending the Col du Petit-Saint-Bernard with the yellow jersey group during stage 16. He incurred a fracture of the right cheekbone and concussion. He had to skip several races to recuperate from his injuries, including the Cycling World Championship held in Mendrisio, Switzerland. He was inactive for a 6-week period and came back to competition at the Tour of Missouri, where he got a warm welcome from cycling fans.

Voigt began his last season with team manager Bjarne Riis (2010) by participating in the Tour Down Under and the Vuelta a Mallorca. In March, Voigt participated in Paris–Nice, where he finished second of the prologue and grabbed the yellow jersey after the third stage, which was shortened  due to snowfall. He lost the jersey the very next day to eventual winner Alberto Contador, but managed to finish fifth overall after Alejandro Valverde's second place was annulled for his implication in the Operación Puerto doping case. Voigt then headed to the Volta a Catalunya, where he won stage 4 after escaping from the peloton to join a group of four riders on the last ascent of the day. He eventually was left with only Rein Taaramäe to worry about, and won the sprint against the  rider. In May, he scored a sixth place overall in the Tour of California thanks to consistent placings in the hilly stages and finishing fifth in the individual time trial held in Los Angeles. He participated to the Tour de France as a domestique to his leaders, the Schleck brothers. Voigt survived a scare on the mountainous stage 16, where he crashed heavily on the descent of the Col de Peyresourde, destroying his bike. After getting back up, he realized that all the team cars had passed and that he would not be handed a new bike. Desperate, he borrowed a child's bike much too small for him, from a children group's car which was following the race. He rode on it for about  before reaching a policeman who had another bicycle which had been left for him by his team. His teammate Andy Schleck finished the Tour in second place, but was later given the title since the original winner Alberto Contador tested positive to clenbuterol.

2011–2014

The 2011 season was to be the first one of his career in which he would not achieve a victory. He joined the newly formed , following the Schleck brothers, Fabian Cancellara and four other riders coming from his 2010 team, . Kim Andersen was the creator of that new team, being himself a former Saxo Bank manager. In the spring, he took part in Paris–Nice, taking the sixth place of the first stage, and then went on to help his teammate Fränk Schleck win the Critérium International. In May, he suffered a fracture to his scaphoid in a crash during the Tour of California, riding a whole stage with the injury before doctors discovered it with X-Rays. He healed in time for the Tour de France, ready to sacrifice himself and put any personal ambitions aside to help his leaders, the Schleck brothers. He played a pivotal role in helping the pair reach the second and third steps of the podium behind 's Cadel Evans. In August, Voigt went to the USA Pro Challenge, and had some good results by taking the fifth place of the prologue and then finishing eighth in the individual time trial. Designated to lead his squad in the Tour of Britain, Voigt suffered his second broken bone of the year in that race, this time a finger bone. The injury occurred in a crash on the first stage and he had to abandon. The healing process was a slow one since it took almost a month for a complete recovery to be achieved.

In 2012, Voigt was the oldest rider of the World Tour teams at 40 years of age when the season started. That did not stop him from going into a long breakaway on the sixth stage of Paris–Nice. After every rider had been dropped but one, Voigt was beaten in a sprint by Luis León Sánchez of the  team. In April, Voigt participated to the Tour of the Basque Country, where a peculiar incident occurred. Voigt signed in late for a stage start, then had a bit of a verbal match against an official who complained about his lateness. He was fined sign: Fr. or SFr. or FS 1,000 Swiss francs for what was described as "comportamiento incorrecto" (bad behavior) in a report. He later had a good showing at the Tour of California, where he came in second of the fifth stage, an individual time trial contested in Bakersfield, 23 seconds behind David Zabriskie. He was also part of breakaways and paced the bunch often. On the Tour de France, he finished in third position of the tenth stage. He was dropped on the slopes of the Col du Grand Colombier, but came back on the four escapees before competing in the final sprint. In August, during a press conference prior to the Tour of Utah, he announced that he would continue racing through the 2013 season. In the same month, Voigt took the fourth stage of the USA Pro Cycling Challenge finishing in Beaver Creek. He attacked his breakaway companions on Independence Pass, which was situated in the first third of the race, and then soloed on to victory with almost three minutes of an advantage over the chasers. He raced more than  alone, taking one of the most epic victory of his career.

Even at 41 years of age, he attacked on the penultimate stage of Tour de France, and won the combative award of the day before he was caught by the overall contenders, just a few kilometers into the final ascent.

Voigt was selected by Trek Factory Racing as part of their team for the 2014 Tour de France, giving him a 17th start on the Grande Boucle, matching the record for Tour starts held by George Hincapie and Stuart O'Grady. He was part of the break on Stage 1 of the tour, winning the combativity prize for the stage and taking the lead in the king of the mountains competition. As a mark of respect, the peloton let Voigt ride at the front on the first lap of the circuit in the Champs-Élysées in Paris where the race concludes, then battled for the sprint, won by Marcel Kittel.

Voigt announced ahead of the 2014 USA Pro Cycling Challenge that the race would be his last as a professional. He almost won Stage 4 in that last race thanks to a day-long breakaway. He was joined by the raging peloton with only 900 meters to go. Before the last stage of the race, Voigt was asked in an interview with Outside Magazine: Americans also like your panache, the fact that you’re willing to go out on a break all day and attack. Where did you get that trait? to which he answered:

In December 2014 Trek Factory Racing announced that Voigt would stay with the team as a coach, with a view to becoming a directeur sportif.

2015 and beyond
In February 2015, it was announced that Voigt would be the official ambassador of the Tour of California. He also served as a television analyst and an adviser to the organizers.

In June 2015, it was announced that Voigt would host an annual Gran Fondo in Marin County, labeled The Jensie Gran Fondo of Marin.

In January 2017, Voigt completed an Everesting on Berlin's Teufelsberg, raising over €29,000 for Australia's Tour de Cure. Voight's Fitbit data showed he rode  in 26.5 hours, climbing . Voigt has ridden in the Tour de Cure Signature Tour annually since 2015.

Hour record

On 3 September 2014, Voigt announced that he would try to beat the UCI hour record of 49.7 kilometers held by Ondřej Sosenka. The record attempt took place on 18 September 2014 in the Vélodrome Suisse in Grenchen. Jens Voigt's plans to attempt the record were hatched in June 2014 and followed some of the planning that was made for Fabian Cancellara's possible crack at the record. At 43 years old, Voigt had to work on his position on his bike to improve his aerodynamics. The bike on which the German rode was revealed on 12 September 2014. The attempt occurred on the day after Voigt's 43rd birthday and was broadcast live by Eurosport and the UCI channel on YouTube. Prior to the attempt, some prominent cycling personalities such as Bradley Wiggins, Eddy Merckx and Chris Boardman expressed the opinion that Voigt had a fair chance of beating the 49.7 km mark.

The record attempt was successful. In front of an audience of 1600 people, Voigt rode 51.110 kilometers during the course of an hour, beating the previous record by 1.410 kilometers. He reached the previous mark on the 199th lap of the velodrome, with 1:28 remaining. Voigt used a modified version of the Trek Speed Concept frame, with dual disc wheels and standard aero bars. He also used a front gearing of 54 teeth and a rear gearing of 14 teeth. Voigt stood up on his machine a couple of times during the event. He was faster at the end of the attempt, as he covered some laps (250 meters) in under 17 seconds. Voigt is the oldest rider to ever beat the record and his average power output was 412 watts. He is also the first German to hold the record. The UCI president, Brian Cookson, believed that this event could be the start of a cascade of attempts by other riders who perform well in time trials.

Setting the hour record capped a 17-year career in which he is estimated to have bicycled 850,000 km (ca. 528,000 miles). Voigt's record stood until 30 October 2014, when it was broken by Austrian cyclist Matthias Brändle.

Doping views
Voigt never tested positive to performance-enhancing drugs in his career. He alleged that he never doped and was always against the practice. At the end of October 2012, he wrote a blog entry to address the turmoil caused by the Lance Armstrong–USADA doping affair, and related in it his personal experiences, stating that he "just never doped". Voigt argued that it was impossible for him to imagine that he would be regarded as a doper and cheater by his children if he took performance-enhancing drugs.

Tyler Hamilton felt Voigt was jeopardizing his fight against doping in autumn 2012. While Hamilton has no proof, he is convinced that Voigt doped. Voigt reacted by saying that he never heard about doping while he was on the CSC team. Hamilton felt this statement was like "spitting in my face", and "the most ridiculous thing I read in my life".

Personal life
Voigt and his wife Stephanie have six children, the youngest born January 2011. They live in Berlin, Germany. Voigt thinks he is "just above the dog" in the hierarchy of his family but he likes it. After his career, he worked as a TV presenter in Germany and in the US. In the US he is part of the NBC Sports coverage team which was led by Phil Liggett and Paul Sherwen, and is now led by Liggett and Bob Roll with added commentary from Voigt, Steve Porino, Christian Vande Velde, Paul Burmeister and Chris Horner.

Career achievements

Major results

1994
 1st  Overall Peace Race
 1st  Overall Niedersachsen-Rundfahrt
1995
 2nd Overall Tour de Normandie
1996
 1st  Overall Sachsen-Tour
 1st Stage 1 Rheinland-Pfalz Rundfahrt
 8th Overall Peace Race
1997
 1st  Overall Niedersachsen-Rundfahrt
1st Stage 5b
 1st Prologue Sachsen Tour
 2nd Overall Tour de Langkawi
 3rd Overall Peace Race
1998
 1st Stage 5a Tour of the Basque Country
 1st  Points classification Prudential Tour
 7th Overall Critérium du Dauphiné Libéré
 7th Grand Prix d'Ouverture La Marseillaise
 8th Overall Étoile de Bessèges
 8th Overall Rheinland-Pfalz Rundfahrt
 Tour de France
Held  after Stage 9
1999
 1st  Overall Critérium International
 1st Breitling Grand Prix
 1st Stage 3 Route du Sud
 1st Duo Normand (with Chris Boardman)
 2nd Overall Étoile de Bessèges
 2nd Grand Prix d'Ouverture La Marseillaise
 3rd Overall Circuit de la Sarthe
 3rd Overall Tour de Pologne
 3rd Grand Prix Eddy Merckx
 3rd Grand Prix des Nations
 9th Time trial, UCI Road World Championships
 9th Overall Paris–Nice
 9th La Flèche Wallonne
2000
 1st  Overall Bayern Rundfahrt
 1st Grand Prix Cholet
 2nd Overall Circuit de la Sarthe
 2nd Grand Prix Eddy Merckx
 4th Grand Prix de Plumelec-Morbihan
 5th Route Adélie
 6th Overall Tirreno–Adriatico
 7th Time trial, UCI Road World Championships
 7th Grand Prix de Rennes
 7th Giro della Romagna
2001
 1st  Overall Bayern Rundfahrt
1st Stage 2 (ITT)
 1st Overall Tour de Poitou
 1st Grand Prix des Nations
 1st Duo Normand (with Jonathan Vaughters)
 Tour de France
1st Stages 4 (TTT) & 16
Held  after Stage 7
 1st Stage 7 Critérium du Dauphiné Libéré
 2nd Overall Tour de Pologne
1st  Points classification
1st Stage 6
 2nd Overall Route du Sud
1st Stage 1
 3rd Overall Critérium International
 3rd Grand Prix de Fourmies
2002
 2nd Overall Bayern Rundfahrt
 3rd Time trial, National Road Championships
 4th Overall Critérium International
1st  Points classification
1st Stage 3 (ITT)
 4th Overall Deutschland Tour
 6th Overall Paris–Nice
2003
 1st  Overall Tour de Poitou
1st Stage 4 (ITT)
 1st Paris–Bourges
 2nd Overall Critérium International
1st Stage 3 (ITT)
 5th Overall Bayern Rundfahrt
 5th Route Adélie
 6th Overall Circuit de la Sarthe
 6th Tour de Vendée
 7th Overall Route du Sud
 7th Grand Prix des Nations
 8th Gran Premio di Chiasso
 10th Tour du Haut Var
2004
 1st  Overall Critérium International
1st Stages 2 & 3 (ITT)
 1st  Overall Bayern Rundfahrt
 1st LuK Challenge Chrono
 Tour of the Basque Country
1st  Mountains classification
1st  Sprints classification
1st Stage 5
 2nd Overall Danmark Rundt
1st Stage 4 (ITT)
 2nd Overall Tour de Georgia
 2nd Overall Deutschland Tour
 2nd Grand Prix Eddy Merckx
 3rd Time trial, National Road Championships
 3rd Overall Tour Méditerranéen
 3rd Klasika Primavera
 4th Overall Paris–Nice
 6th Grand Prix des Nations
 7th Overall Ster Elektrotoer
 8th Trofeo Cala
2005
 1st  Overall Tour Méditerranéen
1st  Points classification
1st Stages 1, 3 & 4 (TTT)
 1st LuK Challenge Chrono
 1st Stage 5a Tour of the Basque Country
 1st Stage 4 (ITT) Bayern Rundfahrt
 2nd Liège–Bastogne–Liège
 3rd Time trial, National Road Championships
 4th Overall Paris–Nice
1st  Points classification
1st Prologue
 4th Overall Étoile de Bessèges
1st Points classification
1st Stage 3
 5th Overall Critérium International
 Tour de France
 Held  after Stage 9
2006
 1st  Overall Deutschland Tour
1st Stages 2, 6 & 7 (ITT)
 1st Rund um die Hainleite
 1st Giro Bochum
 1st Stage 13 Tour de France
 National Road Championships
3rd Road race
3rd Time trial
 10th Overall Ster Elektrotoer
1st Points classification
1st Stage 4
2007
 1st  Overall Critérium International
1st Stage 2
 1st  Overall Deutschland Tour
1st Stage 8
 1st Stage 4 Tour of the Basque Country
 2nd Overall Tour of California
1st Stage 3
 2nd Overall 3-Länder-Tour
 3rd Overall Bayern Rundfahrt
 6th Overall Vuelta a Murcia
 6th Overall Tirreno–Adriatico
2008
 1st  Overall Tour de Pologne
1st  Mountains classification
1st Stage 6
 1st  Overall Critérium International
 1st Stage 18 Giro d'Italia
2009
 1st  Overall Critérium International
1st Stage 2
 3rd Time trial, National Road Championships
 4th Overall Tour of California
 6th Overall Paris–Nice
 7th Overall Tour of Slovenia
2010
 1st Stage 4 Volta a Catalunya
 3rd Time trial, National Road Championships
 4th Overall Vuelta a Andalucía
 5th Overall Paris–Nice
 6th Overall Tour of California
2012
 USA Pro Cycling Challenge
1st  Mountains classification
1st Stage 4
2013
 1st Stage 5 Tour of California
2014
 Tour de France
 Combativity award Stage 1
Held  after Stage 1
 USA Pro Cycling Challenge
1st  Most aggressive rider classification
Most aggressive rider Stages 4 & 7
 World Hour record: 51.110 km

Grand Tour general classification results timeline

World records

References
Notes

Citations

External links

 Profile at Trek Factory Racing team site

 
 
 
 

1971 births
Living people
Cyclists at the 2000 Summer Olympics
Cyclists at the 2004 Summer Olympics
Cyclists at the 2008 Summer Olympics
German Giro d'Italia stage winners
German male cyclists
German Tour de France stage winners
Olympic cyclists of Germany
People from Grevesmühlen
Cyclists from Mecklenburg-Western Pomerania
East German male cyclists
People from Bezirk Rostock